Highway 956, also known as the Garson Lake Road, is a provincial highway in the Canadian province of Saskatchewan. It runs from the Alberta border until  Highway 155. The highway is 44 km (27 mi.) long.

Highway 956 is meant to connect the community of La Loche to Fort McMurray, Alberta. Beyond the Alberta border, the same route continues west as the 65-km La Loche Winter Trail winter road to Alberta Highway 881, about 25 km south of Anzac, Alberta and about 75 km south of Fort McMurray.

History 
Construction began in 1986 and completed in 1999.
In 1999, as part of the Saskatchewan provincial budget, a project was begun to gravel 30 km of Highway 956.
In September 2005, to celebrate the centennials of Saskatchewan and Alberta, Saskatchewan Premier Lorne Calvert and Alberta Premier Ralph Klein announced a project costing $45 million to connect La Loche and Fort McMurray with an all-season road. The premiers explained that this would create economic and recreational opportunities, as well as improved access to services and schools.
A crushing project and two clearing projects had been initiated by the time the 2006–07 Saskatchewan Mid-Year Report was released. They were expected to be completed by the end of 2006.
By May 2006, work began on improving Highway 956 as a joint project by the Alberta and Saskatchewan governments to connect La Loche and Fort McMurray.

See also 
Roads in Saskatchewan
Transportation in Saskatchewan

References 

956